Lodge Park Academy is a coeducational secondary school and sixth form with academy status, located in Corby, Northamptonshire, England.

Background 
Founded in 1964 as Lodge Park School, it was one of the first wave of specialist schools designated in 1994 and was renamed Lodge Park Technology College.

In January 2013 Lodge Park became an Academy in partnership of the David Ross Education Trust.

Awards 
The college has received a number of awards including Investor in People, ArtsMark Gold, the International Schools Award and ICT Mark.

Previous Principals 
The principals of Lodge Park have been Neville Rumbelow, Richard Parker, Tom Waterworth, Guy Shearer, Toby Mullins, Alison Hayes, Darren Gadsby, Leo Gilbert and Meena Wood and Robert Sloan. The current principal, appointed in 2019, is Carly Waterman.

Ofsted judgements 
In 2019 the school was inspected with an outcome of Inadequate – Special Measures.

In 2021 the school was rated 'requires improvement' following an Ofsted inspection.

Sports 
The academy is currently Northamptonshire Sports School of the year, Corby Sports School of the year and holds both the School Games Gold Kitemark and the YST Gold Quality Mark.

Notable former pupils
James Ashworth VC, British soldier and posthumous recipient of the Victoria Cross

Lodge Park Trust 
Lodge Park is a Trust School, in partnership with the David Ross Education Trust.

References

External links 

Secondary schools in North Northamptonshire
Academies in North Northamptonshire